The Musée Claude-Debussy, or Maison Claude Debussy, is the birthplace of the composer Claude Debussy, in Saint-Germain-en-Laye, a western suburb of Paris, France. It contains a small museum about the composer.

The house was built in the 17th century. Claude Debussy was born here on 22 August 1862, and lived here in early childhood; his father had a china shop on the ground floor.

The museum opened in 1990. It is reached by a wooden staircase in the inner courtyard. There are two rooms containing objects, furniture, manuscripts, photographs and paintings relating to the composer. A third room is a small auditorium.

The wooden staircase is a monument historique. The award Maisons des Illustres ("Houses of the illustrious") has been given to the museum.

See also 
 List of music museums

References

Biographical museums in France
Music museums in France
Museums in Yvelines
Debussy
Maisons des Illustres